Vasil Ivanovich Kozlov (18 February 1903 – 2 December 1967) was a Soviet Belarusian partisan and politician. Hero of the Soviet Union (1942).

Early life 
Kozlov was born into a peasant family in the small village of Zagorodnie. In 1919, he began working as mechanic in the nearby town of Zhlobin. He was conscripted for a two-year mandatory service in the Red Army in 1925, and joined the All-Union Communist Party in 1927. Kozlov attended the Minsk University between 1929 and 1933. After graduation, he served as a Kolkhoz party organizer for a year. During 1934, Kozlov was appointed director of the Starobin Machine and Tractor Station, located in the Salihorsk Raion. In 1937, he was posted as the First Secretary of the Communist Party's regional branch in Starobin. A year afterwards, he became the Party's First Secretary in the Chervyen Raion. In 1940, he was promoted to the deputy chairman of the Byelorussian SSR's Council of People's Commissars. In April 1941, Kozlov was given the office of the Second Secretary in the Minsk Region's Communist Party branch.

World War II 
Minsk was occupied by the invading Germans on 26 June 1941. Kozlov remained behind the enemy's lines and was appointed chief of the Voblast's underground Communist Party in July. He was tasked with organizing resistance activities, and led the Minsk partisans until the end of the German occupation. By mid-1942, he commanded a force that consisted of some 50,000 members. In September, he traveled to Moscow to report on the situation in Belarus. There, he was awarded the title Hero of the Soviet Union on 1 September 1942. As commander of one of the occupied republic's largest partisan detachments, he was given the rank of a Major General on 16 September 1943. In July 1944, the Red Army liberated Minsk. Kozlov remained the chairman of the Minsk Voblast's Communist Party regional committee, an office he held for four further years.

Post-war 
On 12 March 1947, Kozlov was elected as the Chairman of Belarus' Supreme Soviet, functioning as such until 17 March 1948. Then, he became the Chief of the Supreme Belorussian Soviet's Presidium. He continued to serve in this post until his death. In addition, he was a candidate member of the Communist Party of the USSR's Central Committee during its 20th, 21st and 22nd convocations, from 25 February 1956 to 29 March 1966. On 8 April 1966, shortly before his death, he was accepted as a full member. Kozlov is buried in Minsk's Eastern Cemetery.

Honours and awards
 Hero of the Soviet Union
 Order of Lenin, five times (incl. 1942)
 Order of the Red Banner (1953)
 Order of the Red Banner of Labour
 Order of the Patriotic War, 1st class, twice

References

External links
Vasily Kozlov on the Heroes of the Soviet Union's register.

1903 births
1967 deaths
People from Zhlobin District
Central Committee of the Communist Party of the Soviet Union members
Heads of state of the Byelorussian Soviet Socialist Republic
Second convocation members of the Supreme Soviet of the Soviet Union
Third convocation members of the Supreme Soviet of the Soviet Union
Fourth convocation members of the Supreme Soviet of the Soviet Union
Fifth convocation members of the Supreme Soviet of the Soviet Union
Sixth convocation members of the Supreme Soviet of the Soviet Union
Seventh convocation members of the Supreme Soviet of the Soviet Union
Members of the Central Committee of the Communist Party of Byelorussia
Members of the Supreme Soviet of the Byelorussian SSR (1947–1950)
Members of the Supreme Soviet of the Byelorussian SSR (1951–1954)
Members of the Supreme Soviet of the Byelorussian SSR (1955–1959)
Members of the Supreme Soviet of the Byelorussian SSR (1959–1962)
Members of the Supreme Soviet of the Byelorussian SSR (1962–1966)
Heroes of the Soviet Union
Recipients of the Order of Lenin
Recipients of the Order of the Red Banner
Recipients of the Order of the Red Banner of Labour
Belarusian partisans
Soviet major generals
Soviet military personnel of World War II
Soviet partisans